The Peace of Westphalia is the collective name for two peace treaties signed in October 1648 in the Westphalian cities of Osnabrück and Münster. They ended the Thirty Years' War (1618–1648) and brought peace to the Holy Roman Empire, closing a calamitous period of European history that killed approximately eight million people. Holy Roman Emperor Ferdinand III, the kingdoms of France and Sweden, and their respective allies among the princes of the Holy Roman Empire, participated in the treaties.

The negotiation process was lengthy and complex. Talks took place in two cities, because each side wanted to meet on territory under its own control. A total of 109 delegations arrived to represent the belligerent states, but not all delegations were present at the same time. Two treaties were signed to end the war in the Empire: the Treaty of Münster and the Treaty of Osnabrück. These treaties ended the Thirty Years' War in the Holy Roman Empire, with the Habsburgs (rulers of Austria and Spain) and their Catholic allies on one side, battling the Protestant powers (Sweden and certain Holy Roman principalities) allied with France (though Catholic, strongly anti-Habsburg under King Louis XIV).

Several scholars of international relations have identified the Peace of Westphalia as the origin of principles crucial to modern international relations, collectively known as Westphalian sovereignty. However, some historians have argued against this, suggesting that such views emerged during the nineteenth and twentieth century in relation to concerns about sovereignty during that time.

Background 
Europe had been battered by both the Thirty Years' War and the Eighty Years' War, exacting a heavy toll in money and lives. The Eighty Years' War was a prolonged struggle for the independence of the Protestant-majority Dutch Republic (the modern Netherlands), supported by Protestant-majority England, against Catholic-dominated Spain and Portugal. The Thirty Years' War was the most deadly of the European wars of religion, centred on the Holy Roman Empire. The war, which developed into four phases, included a large number of domestic and foreign players, siding either with the Catholic League or the Protestant Union (later Heilbronn League). The Peace of Prague (1635) ended most religious aspects of the war, and the French–Habsburg rivalry took over prominence. With between 4.5 million and 8 million dead in the Thirty Years' War alone, and decades of constant warfare, the need for peace became increasingly clear.

Locations

Peace negotiations between France and the Habsburg Emperor began in Cologne in 1636. These negotiations were initially blocked by Cardinal Richelieu of France, who insisted on the inclusion of all his allies, whether fully sovereign countries or states within the Holy Roman Empire. In Hamburg, Sweden, France, and the Holy Roman Empire negotiated a preliminary peace in December 1641. They declared that the preparations of Cologne and the Treaty of Hamburg were preliminaries of an overall peace agreement.

The main peace negotiations took place in Westphalia, in the neighbouring cities of Münster and Osnabrück. Both cities were maintained as neutral and demilitarized zones for the negotiations.

In Münster, negotiations took place between the Holy Roman Empire and France, as well as between the Dutch Republic and Spain who on 30 January 1648 signed a peace treaty ending the Eighty Years' War that was not part of the Peace of Westphalia. Münster had been, since its re-Catholicism in 1535, a strictly mono-denominational community. It housed the Chapter of the Prince-Bishopric of Münster. Only Roman Catholic worship was permitted, while Calvinism and Lutheranism were prohibited.

Sweden preferred to negotiate with the Holy Roman Empire in Osnabrück, which was controlled by Protestant forces. Osnabrück was a bi-denominational Lutheran and Catholic city, with two Lutheran churches and two Catholic churches. The city council was exclusively Lutheran, and the burghers mostly so, but the city also housed the Catholic Chapter of the Prince-Bishopric of Osnabrück and had many other Catholic inhabitants. Osnabrück had been subjugated by troops of the Catholic League from 1628 to 1633 and was then taken by Lutheran Sweden.

Delegations

The peace negotiations had no exact beginning or end, because the 109 delegations never met in a plenary session. Instead, various delegations arrived between 1643 and 1646 and left between 1647 and 1649. The largest number of diplomats were present between January 1646 and July 1647.

Delegations had been sent by 16 European states, 66 Imperial States representing the interests of 140 Imperial States, and 27 interest groups representing 38 groups.
 The French delegation was headed by Henri II d'Orléans, duc de Longueville and further comprised the diplomats Claude d'Avaux and Abel Servien.
 The Swedish delegation was headed by Count Johan Oxenstierna and was assisted by Baron Johan Adler Salvius.
 The Imperial delegation was headed by Count Maximilian von Trautmansdorff. His aides were:
 In Münster, Johann Ludwig von Nassau-Hadamar and Isaak Volmar.
 In Osnabrück, Johann Maximilian von Lamberg and Reichshofrat Johann Krane.
 Philip IV of Spain was represented by two delegations:
 The Spanish delegation was headed by Gaspar de Bracamonte y Guzmán, and notably included the diplomats and writers Diego de Saavedra Fajardo, and Bernardino de Rebolledo.
 The Franche Comté and the Spanish Netherlands were represented by Joseph de Bergaigne (who died before peace was concluded) and Antoine Brun.
 The papal nuncio in Cologne, Fabio Chigi, and the Venetian envoy, Alvise Contarini, acted as mediators.
 Various Imperial States of the Holy Roman Empire also sent delegations.
 Brandenburg sent several representatives, including Volmar.
 The Dutch Republic sent a delegation of six, including two delegates from the province of Holland, including Adriaan Pauw, and Willem Ripperda from the province of Overijssel; two provinces were absent.
 The Swiss Confederacy was represented by Johann Rudolf Wettstein.

Treaties

Two separate treaties constituted the peace settlement:
 The Treaty of Münster (Instrumentum Pacis Monasteriensis, IPM), between the Holy Roman Emperor and France, along with their respective allies
 The Treaty of Osnabrück (Instrumentum Pacis Osnabrugensis, IPO), between the Holy Roman Emperor and Sweden, along with their respective allies

Results

Internal political boundaries

The power asserted by Ferdinand III was stripped from him and returned to the rulers of the Imperial States. The rulers of the Imperial States could again choose their own official religions. Catholics and Protestants were redefined as equal before the law, and Calvinism was given legal recognition as an official religion. The independence of the Dutch Republic, which practiced religious toleration, also provided a safe haven for European Jews.

The Holy See was very displeased at the settlement, with Pope Innocent X calling it "null, void, invalid, iniquitous, unjust, damnable, reprobate, inane, empty of meaning and effect for all time" in the bull Zelo Domus Dei.

Tenets

The main tenets of the Peace of Westphalia were:

 All parties would recognise the Peace of Augsburg of 1555, in which each prince had the right to determine the religion of his own state (the principle of cuius regio, eius religio). However, the ius reformandi was removed: Subjects were no longer forced to follow the conversion of their ruler. Rulers were allowed to choose between Catholicism, Lutheranism, or Calvinism.
 1 January 1624 was defined as the normative date for determining the dominant religion of a state. All ecclesiastical property was to be restored to the condition of 1624. Christians living in principalities where their denomination was not the established church were guaranteed the right to practice their faith in private, as well as in public during allotted hours.
 France and Sweden were recognised as guarantors of the imperial constitution with a right to intercede.

Territorial adjustments

 France retained the Bishoprics of Metz, Toul and Verdun near Lorraine, received the cities of the Décapole in Alsace (except for Strasbourg, the Bishopric of Strasbourg, and Mulhouse) and the city of Pignerol near the Spanish Duchy of Milan.
 Sweden received an indemnity of five million thalers, which it used primarily to pay its troops. Sweden further received Western Pomerania (thenceforth Swedish Pomerania), Wismar, and the Prince-Bishoprics of Bremen and Verden as hereditary fiefs, thus gaining a seat and vote in the Imperial Diet of the Holy Roman Empire as well as in the Upper Saxon, Lower Saxon and Westphalian circle diets (Kreistage). However, the wording of the treaties was ambiguous:
To escape incorporation into Swedish Bremen-Verden, the city of Bremen had claimed Imperial immediacy. The emperor had granted this request and separated the city from the surrounding Bishopric of Bremen. Sweden launched the Swedish-Bremen wars in 1653/54 in a failed attempt to take the city.
The treaty did not decide the Swedish-Brandenburgian border in the Duchy of Pomerania. At Osnabrück, both Sweden and Brandenburg had claimed the whole duchy, which had been under Swedish control since 1630 despite legal claims of Brandenburgian succession. While the parties settled for a border in 1653, the underlying conflict continued.
The treaty ruled that the Dukes of Mecklenburg, owing their re-investiture to the Swedes, cede Wismar and the Mecklenburgian port tolls. While Sweden understood this to include the tolls of all Mecklenburgian ports, the Mecklenburgian dukes as well as the emperor understood this to refer to Wismar only.
Wildeshausen, a petty exclave of Bremen-Verden and fragile basis for Sweden's seat in the Westphalian circle diet, was also claimed by the Bishopric of Münster.
 Bavaria retained the Palatinate's vote in the Electoral College of the Holy Roman Empire, which it was granted by the imperial ban on the Elector Palatine Frederick V in 1623. The Prince Palatine, Frederick's son, was given a new, eighth electoral vote.
 The Palatinate was divided between the re-established Elector Palatine Charles Louis (son and heir of Frederick V) and Elector-Duke Maximilian of Bavaria, and thus between the Protestants and Catholics. Charles Louis obtained the Lower Palatinate, along the Rhine, while Maximilian kept the Upper Palatinate, to the north of Bavaria.
 Brandenburg-Prussia received Farther Pomerania, and the Bishoprics of Magdeburg, Halberstadt, Kammin, and Minden.
 The succession to the Jülich-Cleves-Berg, whose last duke had died in 1609, was clarified. Jülich, Berg, and Ravenstein were given to the Count Palatine of Neuburg, while Cleves, Mark, and Ravensberg went to Brandenburg.
 The Prince-Bishopric of Osnabrück would alternate between Catholic and Lutheran bishops, with the Protestant bishops chosen from the cadets of the House of Brunswick-Lüneburg.
 Barriers to trade and commerce erected during the war were abolished, and "a degree" of free navigation was guaranteed on the Rhine.

Legacy

The treaties did not entirely end conflicts arising out of the Thirty Years' War. Fighting continued between France and Spain until the Treaty of the Pyrenees in 1659. The Dutch-Portuguese War that had begun during the Iberian Union between Spain and Portugal, as part of the Eighty Years' War, went on until 1663. Nevertheless, the Peace of Westphalia did settle many outstanding European issues of the time.

Westphalian sovereignty

Some scholars of international relations have identified the Peace of Westphalia as the origin of principles crucial to modern international relations, including the inviolability of borders and non-interference in the domestic affairs of sovereign states. This system became known in the literature as Westphalian sovereignty. Most modern historians have challenged the association of this system with the Peace of Westphalia, calling it the 'Westphalian Myth.' They have challenged the view that the modern European states system originated with the Westphalian treaties. The treaties do not contain anything in their text about religious freedom, sovereignty, or balance of power that can be construed as international law principles. Constitutional arrangements of the Holy Roman Empire are the only context in which sovereignty and religious equality are mentioned in the text, but they are not new ideas in this context. While the treaties do not contain the basis for the modern laws of nations themselves, they do symbolize the end of a long period of religious conflict in Europe.

See also

 Eighty Years' War
 Freedom of religion
 History of Sweden, 1648–1700
 List of treaties
 Peace of Augsburg
 Peace of Münster
 Thirty Years' War
 Westphalian sovereignty
 Magna Carta

References

Further reading
 Croxton, Derek, and Anuschka Tischer. The Peace of Westphalia: A Historical Dictionary (Greenwood Publishing Group, 2002).
 
 Mowat, R. B. History of European Diplomacy, 1451–1789 (1928) pp 104–14 online
  Historiography.

External links

 Texts of the Westphalian Treaties  (full text in Latin, with translations to German, English, French, Italian, Swedish, and Spanish)
 Peace Treaty of Münster (full text, English translation) – Peace Treaty of Münster (full text, German translation)
 Peace Treaty of Osnabrück (full text, German translation)

Thirty Years' War treaties
1648 treaties
Peace treaties of Sweden
Thirty Years' War
Treaties of the Holy Roman Empire
Treaties of Flanders
Treaties of the Dutch Republic
Peace treaties of the Netherlands
Peace treaties of Spain
Treaties of the Swedish Empire
Peace treaties of the Ancien Régime
Treaties of the Spanish Empire
Treaties of the Margraviate of Brandenburg
Peace of Westphalia
Peace of Westphalia
Peace of Westphalia
Peace of Westphalia
17th century in the Old Swiss Confederacy
History of the Palatinate (region)
17th-century diplomatic conferences
Diplomatic conferences in Germany
Peace of Westphalia
Peace of Westphalia
Peace of Westphalia
Peace of Westphalia
Christina, Queen of Sweden
Ferdinand III, Holy Roman Emperor

hu:Harmincéves háború#A vesztfáliai béke